Bushmead is a suburb of Luton, in the Luton district, in the ceremonial county of Bedfordshire, England, towards the north of the town. The area is roughly bounded by Weybourne Drive to the north, Bradgers Hill Road to the south, Old Bedford Road to the west, and Bradgers Hill and Stopsley Common to the east.

History
Much of the area was once land belonging to Stopsley Common Farm. The farmhouse was built by the Putteridge Estate around 1870, and still stands on Bushmead Road.

Local Area 
The area is mainly residential, with a few educational institutes including the Luton Sixth Form and Bushmead Primary school. There are some local shops located centrally. The area has countryside to its right and this has many walks and paths that lead to Warden Hill and Butterfield green. These areas are popular with dog-walkers and horse riders. The area can also access the local sports centre, Stopsley Recreational Centre, as it is within 15 minutes walking distance from the area. Bushmead Primary School (Ms Joanne Travi, Head Teacher) has recently been inspected by OFSTED school inspectors and was highly rated. Many people choose to live here for this reason.

Politics

Bushmead is part of the Barnfield ward, which is represented by Cllr David Franks (Liberal Democrats) and Cllr Amjid Ali (Liberal Democrats).

The ward forms part of the parliamentary constituency of Luton North, and the MP is Sarah Owen (Labour).

Local attractions

Local newspapers
Two weekly newspapers cover Bushmead, although they are not specific to the area. 

They are the:
 Herald and Post
 Luton News

References

 Luton Borough Council

Areas of Luton